Osdorf may refer to places in Germany:

Osdorf, Schleswig-Holstein, a municipality in the district of Rendsburg-Eckernförde
Osdorf, Hamburg, a quarter of the Free and Hanseatic city of Hamburg
Osdorfer Straße, a railway station in Berlin

See also
, a pre- and post-war fishing trawler, which served during the war as the vorpostenboot V 311 Osdorf